The Women's Suffrage League, founded in 1888, spearheaded the campaign for women's right to vote in South Australia.  In 1894 South Australia became the first Australian colony and the fourth place in the world to grant women's suffrage.  At the same time women were granted the right to stand for election to Parliament, the first place in the world.

History

The Women's Suffrage League evolved from the Social Purity Society, an organisation that was concerned about the social and economic difficulties many women faced. The Society campaigned for fairer treatment of women by the law, and greater legal protection for young women. Thanks to the Society the age of consent for girls was raised to 16 and the age of young people in brothels was regulated.

Members of the Society and similar movements of the period, notably temperance advocates including the W.C.T.U., realised that the key to affecting social change was parliamentary representation. This led the establishment of the Women's Suffrage League of South Australia with the view of initiating a movement for the enfranchisement of women.  Their first meeting was held on 20 July 1888 at the Adelaide YMCA rooms, with about 80 women in attendance along with members of parliament, religious leaders and others. Edward Charles Stirling was appointed as the first chairman of the League, with Mary Lee and Hector McLennan co-secretaries and Rose Birks treasurer. The first female President was Mary Colton, appointed in 1891.

In December, the Constitutional Amendment (Adult Suffrage) Act 1894 was passed, which gave women not only the right to vote but the right to stand for parliament.

Key members
Those key to the suffrage movement in South Australia included:
  Mary Colton, President
  Mary Lee, Secretary
  Rosetta Jane Birks, Treasurer
  Serena Lake
  Elizabeth Webb Nicholls
  Catherine Helen Spence
  Augusta Zadow

The nature of society at the time meant that the role of men was vital for the success of the campaign for women's suffrage. Key men included:
  Sir Edward Stirling, President until 1892
  Hector McLennan Co-secretary with Mary Lee
  Robert Caldwell MHA
  Sylvanus James Magarey
  Joseph Coles Kirby.

Notable members
 C. Louise Boehringer

See also
Women's suffrage in Australia
Temperance movement in Australia
Womanhood Suffrage League of New South Wales

References

Australian suffragists
Organisations based in South Australia